Esteban Righi (4 September 1938 – 5 March 2019) was an Argentine lawyer and politician who served as Minister of the Interior and Attorney General.

References

1938 births
2019 deaths
Ministers of Internal Affairs of Argentina
Justicialist Party politicians
20th-century Argentine lawyers